Megas Alexandros (Alexander the Great) is a former municipality in the Pella regional unit, Greece. Since the 2011 local government reform it is part of the municipality Pella, of which it is a municipal unit. It is named after Alexander the Great. The municipal unit has an area of 88.925 km2. Population 6,941 (2001). The seat of the municipality was in Galatades.

References

Populated places in Pella (regional unit)

bg:Александър Велики (дем)